The 2013 Women's South American Volleyball Championship was the 30th edition of the Women's South American Volleyball Championship, organised by South America's governing volleyball body, the Confederación Sudamericana de Voleibol (CSV). The tournament was played in Ica, Peru from September 18 to 22, 2013.

Brazil won the Continental Championship and qualified to the 2013 World Grand Champions Cup and the 2014 World Championship. Argentina, Peru and Colombia qualified to the 2014 South American World Championship Qualification Tournament in San Juan, Argentina.

Competing nations
The following national teams have confirmed participation:

The following national teams were invited but declined participation:

Round-Robin

|}
All times are local, UTC−5:00

|}

Final standing

Awards

Most Valuable Player

Best Setter

Best Outside Hitters

Best Middle Blockers

Best Opposite

Best Libero

References

External links
CSV official website
Results and live scores

Women's South American Volleyball Championships
South American Volleyball Championships
Volleyball
V
September 2013 sports events in South America